The Vale of White Horse District Council, governing the Vale of White Horse in Oxfordshire, England is elected every four years.

Political control
Since the foundation of the council in 1973, its political control has been as follows:

Leadership
The leaders of the council since 2004 have been:

Council elections
1973 Vale of White Horse District Council election
1976 Vale of White Horse District Council election
1979 Vale of White Horse District Council election (New ward boundaries)
1983 Vale of White Horse District Council election (District boundary changes took place but the number of seats remained the same)
1987 Vale of White Horse District Council election (District boundary changes took place but the number of seats remained the same)
1991 Vale of White Horse District Council election (District boundary changes took place but the number of seats remained the same)
1995 Vale of White Horse District Council election
1999 Vale of White Horse District Council election
2003 Vale of White Horse District Council election (New ward boundaries)
2007 Vale of White Horse District Council election
2011 Vale of White Horse District Council election
2015 Vale of White Horse District Council election (New ward boundaries)
2019 Vale of White Horse District Council election

Election results

By-election results

1995-1999

1999-2003

2003-2007

2007-2011

2011-2015

2019-2023

References

By-election results

External links
Vale of White Horse District Council

 
Vale of White Horse
Council elections in Oxfordshire
District council elections in England